The Toronto Global Forum (TGF) is an annual economic event organized by the International Economic Forum of the Americas since 2007.

Mission
The Toronto Global Forum is a not-for-profit organization presenting annual conferences on national and global economic issues. The TGF mission is to promote open debate and dialogues on national and international issues. Each year, the event welcomes heads of state, Fortune 500 CEOs, international organizations, central bank governors, global economic decision makers and civil society representatives, etc. to foster free discussion between world leaders. The forum brings together more than 2,800 people from across the globe every year.

The forum also provide a platform to facilitate meetings between key world leaders in order to encourage global discourse.

An additional goal of the forum is to provide opportunities for business meetings aimed at promoting partnerships among major Canadian and international corporations. In 2017 there were panel discussions dedicated to Canada's business advantages.

The International Economic Forum of the Americas hosts two other annual events: the Conference of Montreal (founded in 1995), as well as the World Strategic Forum, held in Miami (founded in 2011).

Notable speakers

Advisory board

Chairman 

 John M. Beck, Aecon Group Inc.

Members
Current members of the advisory board of the Toronto Global Forum are:

Dominic Barton, global managing director, McKinsey & Company Show
Laurence Batlle, chief executive officer, RATP Dev
Christiane Bergevin, president, Bergevin Capital and chair of the board, Canadian Chamber of Commerce
Janet De Silva, Toronto Region Board of Trade
Benoit Parent, vice-president, power generation business and nuclear operations, Cummins Sales and Service
Nicholas Rémillard, president and chief executive officer, International Economic Forum of the Americas
Gregory Smith, president and chief executive officer, InstarAGF Asset Management; and executive chairman, Nieuport Aviation Infrastructure Partners
Kenneth Tanenbaum, chairman, Kilmer Developments; and vice-chairman, Kilmer Van Nostrand (KVN)
Michael Thompson, councillor and chair, Economic Development and Culture Committee, City of Toronto government; and chair, Invest Toronto
Geoffrey A. Wilson, president and chief executive officer, PortsToronto
Michael Wilson, chairman, Barclays Capital; former minister of finance of Canada, Canada; and former Canadian ambassador to the United States
Paul Zed, secretary to the Toronto Global Forum advisory board

See also
International Economic Forum of the Americas
Conference of Montreal
World Strategic Forum

References

External links
 Toronto Global Forum
 International Economic Forum of the Americas

Annual events in Toronto
International conferences in Canada
Business conferences
Global economic conferences